MESDAQ (Malaysian Exchange of Securities Dealing and Automated Quotation) was launched on 6 October 1997 as a separate securities market, mostly for listing technology-based companies. It is part of Bursa Malaysia. Among the companies listed on MESDAQ in its early days include Viztel, Greenpacket, Jobstreet and others. The MESDAQ has now been changed to the ACE Market.

References 
 
 

1997 establishments in Malaysia
Bursa Malaysia
Stock exchanges in Malaysia